
Year 594 (DXCIV) was a common year starting on Friday (link will display the full calendar) of the Julian calendar. The denomination 594 for this year has been used since the early medieval period, when the Anno Domini calendar era became the prevalent method in Europe for naming years.

Events 
 By place 
 Byzantine Empire 
 Balkan Campaign: The Slavs invade the Byzantine provinces of Moesia and Macedonia again; during their pillaging the towns of Aquis, Scupi and Zaldapa in Dobruja are destroyed.
 Autumn – Emperor Maurice replaces general Priscus for disobeying orders. He installs his inexperienced brother Peter, as commander-in-chief in charge of the war against the Avars.

 Asia 
 Emperor Wéndi repairs and expands sections of the Great Wall in the north-west, which is undertaken by using forced labour. During the years, thousands of civilians are killed.
 Empress Suiko issues the "Flourishing Three Treasures Edict", officially recognizing the practice of Buddhism in Japan. She begins diplomatic relations with the Sui Dynasty (China).

 By topic 
 Religion 
 Amos succeeds John IV  as Orthodox Patriarch of Jerusalem.
 Approximate date – Pope Gregory I publishes his Dialogues.

Births 
 Kōgyoku, empress of Japan (d. 661)
 Li Shiji, general and chancellor of the Tang Dynasty (d. 669)
 Zubayr ibn al-Awwam, companion of Muhammad (d. 656)
 approximate date
 Ali ibn Abi Talib, first Shia Imam (d. 661)
 Maymuna bint al-Harith, wife of Muhammad 
 Ramla bint Abi Sufyan, wife of Muhammad

Deaths 
 November 17 – Gregory of Tours, bishop and historian
 John IV, patriarch of Jerusalem (approximate date)

References